Mohammad Bazlul Huda (died 28 January 2010) was a Bangladeshi Army officer who was convicted of the assassination of Sheikh Mujibur Rahman, president of Bangladesh. On 28 January 2010, Bazlul was hanged along with Syed Faruque Rahman, Sultan Shahriar Rashid Khan, Mohiuddin Ahmed, and A.K.M. Mohiuddin Ahmed in Old Dhaka Central Jail.

Career
In 1973, Captain Huda was posted to 1st Field Artillery Regiment in Comilla Cantonment along with Major Shariful Haque Dalim. Dalim had gotten into a scuffle with the sons of Awami League leader Gazi Golam Mostafa. Later some officers and soldiers attacked the residence of Mostofa. The officers, including Dalim, lost their commissions in Bangladesh Army because of indiscipline shortly after.

Huda met with other conspirators to finalize the plans on 14 August 1975. On 15 August 1975, Huda was part of the mutinous troops that attacked the home of President Sheikh Mujibur Rahman. Huda along with Major S.H.M.B Noor Chowdhury had shot dead Sheikh Mujib as he was coming down the stairs. Major Syed Faruque Rahman promoted Captain Huda to Major at the home of Sheikh Mujib after Mujib and his members were killed. The assassins were protected by the government of Khondaker Mostaq Ahmad that took power next, through the passage of  1975 Indemnity Ordinance.

In August 1989 Huda had ordered Freedom Party, the party founded by the mutinous officers, activists to attack the Bangabandhu Bhaban when Sheikh Hasina was staying there. On 11 February 1990 an Bangladesh Awami League rally was attacked by activists of Freedom Party killing one member of Bangladesh Awami League. Huda was arrested while fleeing from the spot.

Trial
On 2 October 1996 AFM Mohitul Islam filed a case over the murder of Sheikh Mujib and most of his family members in 1975. Dhaka sessions court on 8 November 1998 had given death sentences to Huda and 14 co-defendants. The convicts filled an appeal with Bangladesh High Court. The High court gave a split verdict with one Justice confirming the death penalty of all 15 while another justice confirmed it for 10 of the accused on 14 December 2000. A third justice only confirmed the sentence of 12 of the accused. On 19 November 2009, Bangladesh Supreme Court confirmed the death sentences of 12 of the accused. On 1996, Huda was arrested in Bangkok, Thailand on charges of shoplifting and ordered to be deported to Bangladesh. He declared himself stateless and applied for asylum U.N. High Commissioner for Refugees.

Death
On 28 January 2010, Huda was executed at Dhaka Central Jail along with 4 other co-conspirators.

References

2010 deaths
Assassination of Sheikh Mujibur Rahman
People convicted of murder by Bangladesh
Bangladeshi lieutenant colonels
4th Jatiya Sangsad members
Bangladesh Freedom Party politicians
Place of birth missing
Year of birth missing